Dunand is a surname. Notable people with the surname include:

Bernard Dunand (born 1936), Swiss competitive sailor and Olympic medalist
Françoise Dunand (born 1934), French historian and professor emeritus of the University of Strasbourg
Jean Dunand (1877–1942), Swiss and French painter, sculptor, metal craftsman and interior designer
Joe Dunand (born 1995), American baseball player
Maurice Dunand (1898–1987), French archaeologist
Victor-Napoléon Vuillerme-Dunand (1810–1876), French puppeteer